The Best of the Pogues is a greatest hits album by The Pogues, released in September 1991. The album was dedicated to the memory of Deborah Korner.

Track listing 
"Fairytale of New York" (Shane MacGowan, Jem Finer)
"Sally MacLennane" (MacGowan)
"Dirty Old Town" (Ewan MacColl)
"The Irish Rover" (Traditional, arr. The Pogues & The Dubliners)
"A Pair of Brown Eyes" (MacGowan)
"Streams of Whiskey" (MacGowan)
"Rainy Night in Soho" (MacGowan)
"Fiesta" (MacGowan, Finer, Kotscher, Lindt)
"Rain Street" (MacGowan)
"Misty Morning, Albert Bridge" (Finer)
"White City" (MacGowan)
"Thousands Are Sailing" (Phil Chevron)
"The Broad Majestic Shannon" (MacGowan)
"The Body of an American" (MacGowan)

Personnel 
 Shane MacGowan – lead vocals, guitar
 Terry Woods – cittern, vocals
 Philip Chevron – guitar, vocals
 Spider Stacy – tin whistle, vocals
 Andrew Ranken – drums
 Jem Finer – banjo, saxophone
 Darryl Hunt – bass guitar
 Kirsty MacColl – vocals on "Fairytale of New York"
 James Fearnley – accordion

Other musicians 
 Cait O'Riordan – bass, vocals
 Siobhan Sheahan – harp on "Fairytale of New York"
 Tommy Keane – Uileann pipes on "Dirty Old Town" and "The Body of an American"
 Henry Benagh – fiddle
 Elvis Costello – acoustic guitar
 Dick Cuthell – flugelhorn on "A Rainy Night in Soho"
 Brian Clarke – alto saxophone on "Fiesta"
 Joe Cashman – tenor saxophone on "Fiesta"
 Eli Thompson – trumpet on "Fiesta"
 Chris Lee – trumpet
 Paul Taylor – trombone
 Ron Kavana – tenor banjo, mandolin on "Thousands Are Sailing"

Charts

Certifications and sales

Notes 
 "Dirty Old Town" written by Ewan MacColl sung by MacGowan and members of The Dubliners
 Tracks produced by Steve Lillywhite except tracks 2, 3, 5 and 14 - Elvis Costello, track 4 - Eamonn Campbell, track 6 - Stan Brennan and track 9 - Joe Strummer

References

1991 greatest hits albums
The Pogues albums
Albums produced by Steve Lillywhite